Culicoides zumbadoi is a species of Culicoides.

References

zumbadoi
Insects described in 2004